Charles Mills Tiebout ( "TEE-bow") (1924–1968) was an American economist and geographer most known for his development of the Tiebout model, which suggested that there were actually non-political solutions to the free rider problem in local governance. He earned recognition in the area of local government and fiscal federalism with his widely cited 1956 paper “A Pure Theory of Local Expenditures”. 

Tiebout graduated from Wesleyan University in 1950, and received a PhD in economics in University of Michigan in 1957. From 1954 to 1958, Tiebout served as a lecturer and assistant professor of economics at Northwestern University. From 1958 to 1962 was an assistant then associate professor of economics at UCLA. He was Professor of Economics and Geography and was co-director for the Center for Urban and Regional Studies at the University of Washington. He died suddenly on January 16, 1968, at age 43.

Tiebout is frequently associated with the concept of foot voting, that is, physically moving to another jurisdiction where policies are closer to one's ideologies, instead of voting to change a government or its policies.

Major publications

References

External links
 Charles Tiebout page at University of Washington site
 Information about Charles Tiebout in William A. Fischel article "Municipal Corporations, Homeowners, and the Benefit View of the Property Tax"
 

Regional economists
1924 births
1968 deaths
Wesleyan University alumni
University of Michigan alumni
20th-century American economists
University of Washington faculty